A Escrava Isaura (The Slave Isaura) is a 2004 Brazilian telenovela based on A Escrava Isaura, an 1875 abolitionist romance novel by Bernardo Guimarães. The series tells the story of a coffee-plantation owner's passion for one of his slaves. Herval Rossano directed both this and the 1976 version.

Rede Record, run by televangelist Edir Macedo, produced this expanded remake of a serial that aired in 1976 on Rede Globo. The series drew high ratings among Brazilian viewers and was expanded from 100 to 167 episodes. It airs in Europe and the Middle East on Zone Romantica.

Story
This melodrama focuses on the conflict between the beautiful light-skinned slave woman Isaura (Bianca Rinaldi, originally, Lucélia Santos) and her cruel, lecherous master Leôncio (Leopold Pacheco, originally Rubens de Falco) in 1855 Brazil. The heroine is the 20-year-old daughter of a white father and a mulatto mother. She was born and raised on the coffee plantation of Commander Almeida (Rubens de Falco) in the village of Goitacaces. When Juliana, Isaura's mother (Valquiria Ribeiro), dies shortly after giving birth, Gertrudes (Norma Blum), the commander's wife, treats the child as her own daughter, giving her an education and fine manners.

Isaura is devoutly religious; she prays often, avoids the witchcraft practiced by some other slaves and often wears a prominent cross around her neck. Her father, a free laborer, repeatedly begs for her freedom and makes offer after offer to buy her from the commander. Despite promises to set her free one day, every offer is rejected. Isaura remains a slave because she is a slave's daughter—and freedom always seems to be just beyond her reach. When commander realizes his fault, it is too late.

In 1854, when Isaura is a young adult, the commander’s son Leôncio returns to the fazenda after piling up enormous debts. He soon marries Malvina (Maria Ribeiro), daughter of Colonel Sebastiao (Paulo Figueiredo). Nevertheless, he develops a dangerous fixation with Isaura and determines to make her his mistress.

The commander and Gertrudes protect Isaura from Leôncio for a while, but they become ill and pass away before setting her free. The sweet young woman winds up at the mercy of an obsessed, depraved man, fighting to maintain her dignity and integrity. As Isaura desperately struggles to keep her dreams alive, she discovers true love for the first time.

Telemundo
Telemundo started airing the serial as La Esclava Isaura (dubbed into Spanish) in the US on May 7, 2007.  It temporarily aired for two hours per night from 9 to 11 p.m. (ET/PT) from July 24 until August 3, 2007.   
The finale aired December 3, 2007.

In June, 2007, Isaura's time slot (which included one soccer preemption) averaged 680,000 core adult viewers (ages 18 to 49).  That was a 16 percent increase over the year before, when Decisiones aired during that hour, according to Nielsen Media Research.  During November, the show averaged 587,000 core viewers.

Cast
Bianca Rinaldi as Isaura dos Anjos, the slave girl
Leopoldo Pacheco as Leôncio Almeida, Commander Almeida's evil son, obsessed with Isaura
Maria Ribeiro as Malvina, Leôncio's jealous wife
Jackson Antunes as Miguel, Isaura's father
Rubens de Falco as Almeida, the commander
Norma Blum as Gertrudes, the commander's wife
Theo Becker as Álvaro Medonça (Mendoza), the suitor
Paulo Figueiredo as Col. Sebastião Cunha, Malvina's father
Valquiria Ribeiro as Juliana, Isaura's mother
Mayara Magri as Countess Tomásia de Melo Albuquerque de Sousa Javier, Leôncio's major enemy
Patrícia França as Rosa, illegitimate daughter of Col. Sebastião (later becomes his slave), Leôncio's slave that is jealous of Isaura
Déo Garcez as André, Leôncio's slave, in love with Isaura
Míriam Mehler as Gioconda, Tomásia's mother
Ewerton De Castro as Belchior, humped ugly gardener in Leôncio's house, in love with Isaura
Jonas Mello as Francisco [or Seu (Señor) Chico], Leoncio's foreman
Fernanda Nobre as Helena, Malvina's sister
Lugui Palhares as Diogo, Tomásia's cousin
André Fusko as Gabriel, Tomásia's brother
Gabriel Gracindo as Henrique, Malvina's brother
Paula Lobo Antunes as Aurora, Sebastião's second cousin
Silvia Bandeira as Perpétua, Álvaro's mother
Renata Dominguez as Branca, Geraldo's sister in love with Álvaro; she later becomes crazy
Aldine Müller as Estela, Perpétua's friend
Ivan De Almeida as João, André's father
Chica Lopes as Joaquina, André's aunt
Christovam Neto as Bernardo, Tomasia's freed slave
Bárbara Garcia as Lipanesa [or Moleca], Bernardo's love
Fábio Junqueira as Dr. Paulo Pereira, Helena's arranged husband
Caio Junqueira as Geraldo Villela, Estela's son, Álvaro's friend
Cláudio Curi as Cap. Martinho, Slave hunter
Rômulo Delduque as Raimundo, Leôncio's foreman
Rodrigo Zanardi as Aloíso Guimarães, sergeant
Maria Cláudia as Serafina, owner of a bar and prostitute
Lígia Fagundes as Flor-de-Lís, prostitute
Thaís Lima as Margarida, prostitute
Daniela Duarte as Violeta, prostitute

Cast notes
Rubens de Falco, who played Commander Almeida, played Leôncio (the role played here by Leopoldo Pacheco) in the original 1976 version of this novela. Likewise, Norma Blum, who played Getrudes, played Malvina (played here by Maria Ribeiro) in the original 1976 version.

References

External links
Zone Romantica official site (English)
Telemundo official site (Spanish)
Doblaje en Español - Spanish voice cast list
Telenovela World (bilingual)

2004 telenovelas
2004 Brazilian television series debuts
2005 Brazilian television series endings
Brazilian telenovelas
RecordTV telenovelas
Portuguese-language telenovelas
Television shows based on Brazilian novels
Television shows set in Brazil
Television series set in the 1850s